T'ika Wasi (Quechua t'ika flower, wasi house, "flower house", also spelled Thika Huasi) is a  mountain in the Andes of Bolivia. It is located in the Potosí Department, Nor Chichas Province, Cotagaita Municipality. T'ika Wasi lies north of the Jara Wayq'u, an affluent of the Caiti River.

References 

Mountains of Potosí Department